The Occupation of Kharkiv was the first episode of the Ukrainian-Soviet War, during which on 23 December 1917, the Russian Bolsheviks seized the Ukrainian city Kharkiv and installed Soviet power there. The Ukrainian authorities failed to expel the Bolsheviks and the last Ukrainian regiments in the city were disarmed on 10 January 1918.

Events 
Initially, it was stated that the arrival of the Red troops in Ukraine was due only to the need for the advancement of Soviet troops on the Ukrainian railroad that were heading against the rebellious Russian Whites under Alexey Kaledin, which had occupied Rostov-on-Don on 15 December. In December 1917 the Leninist government was not yet ready for a full-scale war against the Ukrainian People's Republic (UPR).

A complete anarchy was established in Kharkiv, and even the local Bolsheviks and the Kharkiv City Duma urged the withdrawal of violent red detachments from the city.

On the night of 10 January, local Red Guard units unexpectedly disarmed the two regiments of the UPR (2700 bayonets), which had been trying to preserve dual power (UPR and Bolsheviks) in the city for 20 days. Some 300 disarmed UPR soldiers wished to join the socialist revolution and were enlisted in the Soviet Army as an independent unit, the regiment of the Red Cossacks. 

Kharkiv became the capital of the Ukrainian People's Republic of Soviets until 19 April 1918, when German units and the UPR Zaporozhian Division under Petro Bolbochan's command took Kharkiv from the Bolsheviks.

Sources

1917 in Ukraine
Kharkiv
Kharkiv
History of Kharkiv